Lillian Frøhling Hansen (born November 22, 1964 as Lillian Frøhling) is a Danish female curler. 

Teams

Women's

Mixed

References

External links

Living people
1964 births

Danish curling champions
Danish female curlers